Washington Township is a township in Indiana County, Pennsylvania, United States. The population was 1,670 at the 2020 census.  The township includes the communities of Advance, Davis, Five Points, and Willet (previously called Marlin's Mill). It surrounds but does not include the borough of Creekside.

History
The Harmon's Covered Bridge and Trusal Covered Bridge were listed on the National Register of Historic Places in 1979.

Geography
According to the United States Census Bureau, the township has a total area of 38.3 square miles (99.1 km2), all  land.

Demographics

As of the census of 2000, there were 1,805 people, 661 households, and 524 families residing in the township.  The population density was 47.2 people per square mile (18.2/km2).  There were 714 housing units at an average density of 18.7/sq mi (7.2/km2).  The racial makeup of the township was 99.06% White, 0.22% African American, 0.06% Asian, and 0.66% from two or more races. Hispanic or Latino of any race were 0.06% of the population.

There were 661 households, out of which 36.5% had children under the age of 18 living with them, 68.7% were married couples living together, 5.4% had a female householder with no husband present, and 20.7% were non-families. 16.2% of all households were made up of individuals, and 5.9% had someone living alone who was 65 years of age or older.  The average household size was 2.73 and the average family size was 3.03.

In the township the population was spread out, with 25.5% under the age of 18, 8.8% from 18 to 24, 30.1% from 25 to 44, 26.3% from 45 to 64, and 9.4% who were 65 years of age or older.  The median age was 37 years. For every 100 females there were 109.2 males.  For every 100 females age 18 and over, there were 111.0 males.

The median income for a household in the township was $33,942, and the median income for a family was $37,917. Males had a median income of $28,229 versus $20,926 for females. The per capita income for the township was $14,870.  About 7.8% of families and 9.9% of the population were below the poverty line, including 10.8% of those under age 18 and 10.2% of those age 65 or over.

References 

Townships in Indiana County, Pennsylvania
Townships in Pennsylvania